Guangzhou City Football Club (广州城) is a Chinese professional football club that competes in the Chinese Super League under licence from the Chinese Football Association (CFA). The team is based in Guangzhou, Guangdong, and their home venue is the Yuexiushan Stadium which has a seating capacity of 18,000. They are owned by the Chinese property developers R&F Properties who took charge in June 2011. The club's name between 2011 and 2020 was Guangzhou R&F, which was short for rich (富) and force (力). The club changed its name to Guangzhou City in December 2020.

The club was founded in 1986 in Shenyang, Liaoning as Shenyang Football Team. They played at the 55,000-seat Wulihe Stadium (五里河体育场), until they moved to Changsha, Hunan in 2007 to reside in the Helong Stadium. American sportswear and sports equipment company MAZAMBA took over the club in 2010, and relocated the club to Shenzhen, Guangdong in February 2011. Their ownership was brief, and by June 2011 Chinese property developers Guangzhou R&F gained ownership of the club and moved them to Guangzhou. The club had their most successful season in 2014 as they finished third in the league and qualified for the 2015 AFC Champions League.

History

History before moving to Guangzhou
The club was founded in 1986 by the local Shenyang government sports body to take part in the Chinese football league system. The club was named Shenyang (沈阳). The team started at the bottom of the league system by playing in the second division. They were promoted to the 1988 Chinese Jia-A League quickly after the league expanded and Liaoning FC was ineligible to field their reserve team in the same division. The club was relegated after only one season. With the following campaigns the club mostly remained within the second tier, except for a short foray in the 1992 Chinese Jia-A League campaign; however, again they were relegated after only one season.

By the 1994 league season the entire Chinese football league system had become professional. The team were allowed to gather sponsorship and rename themselves Shenyang Liuyao (沈阳东北六药), and were allowed to join the top tier due to their 1992 membership. When the team were relegated again at the end of the season they rename themselves Shenyang Huayang (沈阳华阳) and then Shenyang Sealion (沈阳海狮) in 1996. Again the club won promotion to the top tier; however, unlike before they were able to avoid relegation. This was to be the beginning of the club's establishment within the league, though the team benefitted from several seasons where there was no relegation while the league expanded. In 2001 the club was taken over by Ginde Plastic Pipe Industry Group, a subsidiary of the Hongyuan Group and changed its name to Shenyang Ginde (沈阳金德). In 2007 the club's homeground Wulihe Stadium (五里河体育场) was demolished. While it was expected that the club move to another stadium within Shenyang, especially the Shenyang Olympic Sports Center Stadium, a deal did not go through and the club moved to Changsha in Hunan and changed their name to Changsha Ginde (长沙金德).

After Changsha Ginde were relegated to League One at the end of the 2010 league season, the club was purchased by MAZAMBA and moved into the Shenzhen Stadium in the city of Shenzhen, Guangdong in February 2011. To represent this change the owners changed the club's name to Shenzhen Phoenix and changed the home kit from sky blue to green. By May 2011 the club was exposed as having serious financial problems and were struggling to pay their players and their hotel accommodation.

History in Guangzhou 
In serious doubt of completing the 2011 season, Shenzhen Phoenix was put up for sale. The club was bought by Chinese property developers Guangzhou R&F who moved the club to the Yuexiushan Stadium in Guangzhou and changed the club's colours back to blue. Under the new ownership results significantly improved and the club gained promotion back into the top tier at the end of the 2011 China League One season. The team finished the league in seventh, and the club's owners decided to commit their long-term future to the club by establishing a football school in Meizhou. The start of the 2013 Chinese Super League season, however, the club struggled in the league and the manager Sérgio Farias was fired. Former England manager Sven-Göran Eriksson was appointed to replace him on June 4, 2013, and given a 19-month contract. Eriksson's first full season would see the club finish third, its highest league finish, and qualify for the Asian Champions League for the first time. Moroccan striker Abderazzak Hamdallah was a key player for the team, scoring 22 times in 22 appearances. However, manager Eriksson left at the end of his contract and moved to Shanghai SIPG who had finished fifth that year.

On January 2, 2015, the club announced that Cosmin Contra would be their new manager. Contra coached the club in their maiden appearance in the Asian Champions League, coming through the preliminary stages against Warriors FC and Central Coast Mariners to earn a place in the group stage. However, despite an away victory over Gamba Osaka, Guangzhou R&F were eliminated at the group stage. The club's league form was also poor and Contra was sacked on July 22. Li Bing was installed as caretaker manager. There were more changes as Korean defensive midfielder Park Jong-woo and the injured and unsettled Hamdallah also left the club mid-season. Hamdallah only scored three goals in 2015, making him the club's all-time leading foreign scorer at the time with 25, one ahead of Yakubu. The disruption continued as R&F were forced to play some of their home matches at Guangzhou's University City Stadium whilst Yuexiushan was being refurbished, just as in 2012.

The Dragan Stojkovic era 
Guangzhou R&F announced Dragan Stojković as their new manager on 24 August and handed the former Yugoslav international a contract to the end of the 2017 season. Stojkovic preserved R&F's top flight status as they finished 14th out of 16 teams in 2015.

In July 2016, R&F signed Israeli international Eran Zahavi from Maccabi Tel Aviv F.C. Whilst home stadium Yuexiushan was being refurbished, R&F played their opening home games in 2017 at the Guangdong Provincial People's Stadium. Stojkovic's attacking style of play and Zahavi's goals led R&F to finish fifth in the CSL in 2017. There was double disappointment on the final day of the season however as the club fell just short of qualifying for the ACL and Zahavi missed out on breaking the single season CSL scoring record by just one goal. However, his 27 goals earned him the 2017 golden boot. Guangzhou R&F reached the semi-finals of the CFA Cup in 2018 but had a disappointing CSL campaign as they finished 10th.

Guangzhou R&F finished 12th in the CSL in 2019. In attack, Zahavi's 29 goals set a new single season scoring record but the team had the worst defensive record in the league, conceding 72 goals in 30 games. After spending over four seasons at the club - making him Guangzhou R&F's longest ever serving manager - Stojkovic left the club in January 2020.

Giovanni van Bronckhorst was announced as Guangzhou R&F's new manager on 4 January 2020. The CSL's format was disrupted because of COVID-19 but van Bronckhorst led the team to an 11th-place finish. After a CFA Cup quarter final loss on penalties, the club announced on 3 December 2020 that van Bronckhorst had resigned as manager for personal reasons.

In accordance with new national rules on the removal of sponsors from club names, on 18 December 2020 the club changed its name to Guangzhou City (广州城足球俱乐部).

Name history 
1986–1993: Shenyang (沈阳)
1994: Shenyang Liuyao (沈阳东北六药)
1995: Shenyang Huayang (沈阳华阳)
1996–2001: Shenyang Sealion (沈阳海狮)
2001–2006: Shenyang Ginde (沈阳金德)
2007–2010: Changsha Ginde (长沙金德)
2011：Shenzhen Phoenix (深圳凤凰)
2011–2020：Guangzhou R&F (广州富力)
2020–：Guangzhou City (广州城)

Rivalries 

The club took part in the Liaoning Derby, a regional fixture contested against Dalian Football Club and Liaoning FC while the club was located in Shenyang. The tie against Liaoning FC was the more intimate affair because the clubs shared the Shenyang People's Stadium in the 1994 league season compared to the Dalian fixture, which historically saw few meaningful clashes. At the end of the 2006 league season the club left this derby when they moved out of Shenyang.

When the club moved to, Guangzhou they soon formed a rivalry with Guangzhou Evergrande, which is often referred to as the Canton derby. The first derby was played at Yuexiushan Stadium in a league match on March 16, 2012 and Guangzhou R&F won 2–0 at home against the reigning league champions. The venue was significant because it had been Guangzhou Evergrande's home ground. However, the two club owners, Zhang Li and Xu Jiayin, did not view the derby with hostility and on the return fixture, which R&F won 1–0, they were seen enjoying a meal together instead of watching the game.

Players

Out on loan

Club officials

Senior staff 
{|class="wikitable"
|-
!Position
!Staff
|-
|Chairman|| Huang Yu (黄宇)
|-
|General manager|| Zhang Bin (章彬)
|-

Technical staff 
{|class="wikitable"
|-
!Position
!Staff
|-
|Manager|| Li Weifeng
|-
|rowspan="2"|Assistant managers|| Hao Haitao
|-
| Niu Li
|-
|Goalkeeper coach|| Li Wei
|-
|Technical Director|| Zhao Junzhe
|-
|Team Leader|| Li Zhe
|-
|Medical officer|| Fan Bihua
|-
|rowspan="2"|Team physicians|| Raldy van Haastert
|-
| Niels van Sundert
|-
|rowspan="2"|Team Affairs|| Chen Qingming
|-
| Liu Fan
|-
|Spokesperson|| Weng Zhanhong
|-
|rowspan="3"|Interpreters|| Hong Wenjie
|-
| Wu Yaoxing
|-
| Chen Jiachao
|-

Managerial history 

 Serhiy Morozov (1994)
 Zhang Zengqun (1995)
 Li Yingfa (1996)
 Li Qiang (1996–98)
 Ademar Braga (1999)
 Li Qiang (1999)
 Valery Nepomnyashchy (2000)
 Henryk Kasperczak (2000–01)
 Alain Laurier (2001)
 Toni (July 1, 2002 – Dec 31, 2002)
 Dragoslav Stepanović (June 26, 2003 – Dec 31, 2003)
 Bob Houghton (Nov 25, 2005 – June 9, 2006)
 Martin Koopman (2006)
 Milan Živadinović (2007)
 Slobodan Santrač (Jan 1, 2008 – June 30, 2008)
 Zhu Bo (July 21, 2008 – Oct 12, 2009)
 Hao Wei (Oct 12, 2009 – June 21, 2010)
 Miodrag Ješić (June 21, 2010 – 2010)
 Li Shubin (Feb 27, 2011 – Nov 22, 2011)
 Sérgio Farias (Nov 22, 2011 – May 18, 2013)
 Li Bing (Caretaker) (May 19, 2013 – June 3, 2013)
 Sven-Göran Eriksson (June 4, 2013 – November 10, 2014)
 Cosmin Contra (Jan 4, 2015 – July 22, 2015)
 Li Bing (Caretaker) (July 22, 2015 – Aug 24, 2015)
 Dragan Stojković a.k.a. Piksi (Aug 24, 2015 – Jan 3, 2020)
 Giovanni van Bronckhorst (Jan 4, 2020 – Dec 3, 2020) 
 Jean-Paul van Gastel (Jan 31, 2021 – current)

Honours

League 
Jia B Champions/China League One
Runners-up (2): 1991, 2011

Professional club records 
For Guangzhou R&F in league football as of the end of the 2018 season

Team records 

Record home victory: 6–2 v Hangzhou Greentown (2014), 6–2 v Yanbian Funde (2017)
Record away victory: 5–1 v Liaoning Whowin FC (2014)
 Record home defeat: 2–6 v Tianjin Quanjian (2018)
 Record away defeat: 0–6 v Beijing Guoan (2013)
 Most cleansheets: 9 (2014)
 Fewest cleansheets: 5 (2012, 2017, 2018)

Player records 

 Top domestic goalscorer: 20, Xiao Zhi
 Top foreign goalscorer: 87, Eran Zahavi
 Youngest domestic goalscorer: 20 years old (2018) Ma Junliang
 Youngest foreign goalscorer: 19 years old (2014) Aaron Samuel Olanare
 Most goals in a season: 29 (2019) Eran Zahavi
 Fastest hat-trick: 10 minutes (2014) Abderazzak Hamdallah
 Most appearances by a goalkeeper: 168, Cheng Yuelei
 Most appearances by an outfield player: 200, Tang Miao
 Oldest player: 35 years, 6 months, 23 days, Zhang Yaokun

Results

All-time League rankings 

As of the end of 2022 season.

 in group stage
 Liaoning B team promoted to 1 level, but according to CFA rules a club could only enter 1 team in top level so that Senyang replaced Liaoning B's place in 1 level
 Joins 1994 Jia-A League as 1992 member
 no relegation

Key
<div>

 Pld = Played
 W = Games won
 D = Games drawn
 L = Games lost
 F = Goals for
 A = Goals against
 Pts = Points
 Pos = Final position

 DNQ = Did not qualify
 DNE = Did not enter
 NH = Not Held
 – = Does Not Exist
 R1 = Round 1
 R2 = Round 2
 R3 = Round 3
 R4 = Round 4

 F = Final
 SF = Semi-finals
 QF = Quarter-finals
 R16 = Round of 16
 Group = Group stage
 GS2 = Second Group stage
 QR1 = First Qualifying Round
 QR2 = Second Qualifying Round
 QR3 = Third Qualifying Round

International results 
Guangzhou City played in the Asian Champions League in 2015. They beat Singaporean side Warriors FC and Australian team Central Coast Mariners in the qualifying rounds but were knocked-out in the group stage.

R&F (Hong Kong) 

In August 2016, it was announced that R&F had entered a satellite team into the Hong Kong Premier League. Players registered for the Chinese Super League are ineligible to play in the Hong Kong Premier League, and vice versa. R&F (Hong Kong) played their home matches at the Siu Sai Wan Sports Ground during the first season. The following year, they were permitted to play their home matches at Yanzigang Stadium in Guangzhou under the condition that all away teams' travelling expenses would be covered by R&F.

Past and present internationals 
This list contains the present and former international football players playing for Guangzhou City.

Apostolos Giannou (2016–2017)

Han Jiaqi (2019–present)
Jiang Ning (2013–2015)
Jiang Zhipeng (2014–2017)
Tang Miao (2011–present)
Xiao Zhi (2016–2019)
Xu Bo (2004–2014)
Yu Yang (2015–2016)
Zhang Yuan (2012–2015)

Jeremy Bokila (2015)

Eran Zahavi (2016–2020)
Dia Saba (2019–2020) 

Tan Chun Lok (2019–present)

Jang Hyun-soo (2014–2017)
Park Jong-woo (2014–2015)

Abderrazak Hamdallah (2014–2015)

Yakubu Ayegbeni (2012–2013)
Aaron Samuel Olanare (2014–2015)

Gustav Svensson (2016, 2021)

References

External links 

   
 Guangzhou R&F logo
 Guangzhou City F.C. at Weltfussballarchiv

Guangzhou City F.C.
Chinese Super League clubs
Football clubs in Guangzhou
Association football clubs established in 2011
2011 establishments in China